Gwyneth Glyn (born Gwyneth Glyn Evans, 14 December 1979) is a Welsh language poet and musician.

Biography
Gwyneth Glyn was born in St David's Hospital in Bangor, Gwynedd, and grew up at her family home in Llanarmon. She was educated at Ysgol Glan y Môr, Pwllheli and Coleg Meirion-Dwyfor before going on to gain a first class honours degree in Philosophy and Theology at Jesus College, Oxford.

She was a member of the band Coca Rosa and the Dirty Cousins.

She won the Crown at the 1998 Urdd Gobaith Cymru Eisteddfod, and was the Welsh Children's Poet Laureate for 2006–2007.

Bibliography
 Gwneud Môr a Mynydd (Gwyneth Glyn Evans, Lowri Davies, Esyllt Nest Roberts), June 2000 (Gwasg Carreg Gwalch)
 Straeon Bolwyn: Bolwyn a'r Dyn Eira Cas, November 2000 (Gwasg Carreg Gwalch)
 Straeon Bolwyn: Bolwyn yn y Sioe Nadolig, November 2000, (Gwasg Carreg Gwalch])
 Plant Mewn Panig!, October 2004, (Dref Wen)
 Drws Arall i'r Coed (Gwyneth Glyn Evans, Eurgain Haf, Dyfrig Jones, Caryl Lewis, Manon Wyn), February 2005 (Sgript Cymru)
 Cyfres Pen Dafad: Mewn Limbo/Sbinia (Gwyneth Glyn Evans, Bedwyr Rees - CD), July 2005 (Cwmni Recordio Sain)
 Cyfres Pen Dafad: Aminah a Minna, November 2005 (Y Lolfa)
 Dramâu'r Drain: Deryn Mewn Llaw, January 2006 (Y Lolfa)
 Cyfres Codi'r Llenni - Mewn Limbo: Sgript a Gweithgareddau (Gwyneth Glyn Evans, Lowri Cynan), January 2007 (Y Lolfa)
 Cyfres Pen Dafad: Mewn Limbo, May 2007 (Y Lolfa)

Discography

Albums
 Wyneb dros dro ("A temporary face" [Idiomatically, "temporary surface", used on road signs]), 2005 (Slacyr)
 Tonau ("Waves"), 2007 (Recordiau Gwinllan)
 Cainc ("Branches"), 2011
 Tro ("Turn"), 2017 (Bendigedig)

Singles
 Paid â Deud ("Don't Say") (collaboration with Cowbois Rhos Botwnnog), 2008 (Sbrigyn Ymborth)

Reception 
Her song 'Can y Cŵn' from 2017 album Tro was nominated for a BBC Radio 2 folk award in February 2018. This was her second nomination, the first was following her involvement in the Songs of Separation Cardiff concert of 2016 featuring British female folk artists, which won the Best Album in 2017.

References

External links
 Gwyneth Glyn MySpace site
 Gwyneth Glyn at Amazon.com
 Gwyneth Glyn biography from BBC Wales
 http://gwynethglyn.com/en/

1979 births
Living people
Alumni of Jesus College, Oxford
People from Gwynedd
People educated at Ysgol Glan y Môr
21st-century Welsh women singers
Welsh-language poets
Welsh guitarists
Welsh singer-songwriters
Welsh-language singers
Welsh-speaking musicians
21st-century British guitarists
21st-century women guitarists